Banchory Academy is a secondary school serving Banchory, Scotland and surroundings, including the neighbouring communities of Raemoir, Crathes, Strachan, Drumoak, Durris, Inchmarlo and Glassel. The current school roll is around 800 pupils.

Rector

Banchory Academy's current rector is Judith Wight. She is assisted by depute rectors Moira Paterson, Michelle Skellern and Gill Bruce.

Academic performance
Banchory Academy ranks amongst the top state schools in Scotland, performing consistently well in SQA examinations. As of 2019, Banchory Academy was the highest performing state school in Aberdeenshire and the 13th highest performing state secondary school in Scotland. 62% of Banchory Academy pupils obtain at least 5 SCQF level 6 awards.

A consistently above average proportion of pupils remain at school for fifth and sixth year to take National 5, Higher and Advanced Higher courses. The HM Inspectors of Education report in 2006 judged school accommodation as being 'weak', noting that it was insufficient for the rising school roll.  All other school quality indicators were rated 'good', 'very good' or 'excellent'.

Banchory Academy in the news
In 2008 turf lawn was laid in the sixth year common room.

Notes

External links
Official website

Secondary schools in Aberdeenshire
Banchory